École supérieure d'ingénieurs des travaux de la construction de Paris (ESITC Paris) a French engineering College created in 1992.

Through a 5-year course and subjects related to construction, ESITC Paris trains future works engineers who can work both in the field and in management offices.

Located in Arcueil, the ESITC Paris is a private higher education institution of general interest recognised by the State. The school is a member of the Union of Independent Grandes Écoles (UGEI).

References

External links
 ESITC Paris

Engineering universities and colleges in France
ESITC Paris
Val-de-Marne
Educational institutions established in 1992
1992 establishments in France